4-Ethylamphetamine (4-EA) is a substituted amphetamine derivative which has been sold as a designer drug. It is mainly known as a synthetic intermediate used as a building block to manufacture larger molecules, but 4-EA is closely related in chemical structure to designer drugs such as 4-methylamphetamine and 4-ethylmethcathinone, and is both a synthetic precursor and a metabolite of the 25-NB derivative 4-EA-NBOMe.

See also 
 25E-NBOMe
 4-Et-PVP
 Amfepentorex
 DOET
 RTI-83

References 

Substituted amphetamines